The 1951 Indian general election was the first democratic national election held in India after Independence, and the polls in Madras state were held for 62 constituencies with 75 seats. This State had the second largest number of seats, after Uttar Pradesh. The result was a victory for Indian National Congress winning 35 out of the 75 seats.  While the remaining seats were won by left and independent parties, opposed to Congress. However, Congress stalwarts such as N. G. Ranga, Durgabai Deshmukh, and Mosalikanti Thirumala Rao lost in that election from the Telugu-speaking areas then referred as Andhra. Reason for the poor performance in Andhra region was attributed to the party's delay in the formation of a separate State for Telugu people. It eventually led to the formation of the Andhra state in 1953 and later the linguistic reorganization of Indian states in 1956 where Kannada and Malayalam majority speaking areas were merged with Mysore and Kerala States respectively.

Voting and results

Results by Alliance

 Independent parties are local state parties, that are unrecognised nationally

Results by Parties

Results by Linguistic areas

Results by Tamil-majority constituencies
These were 31 constituencies with 38 seats, namely Madras, Thiruvallur (2 seats), Chengalpattu, Kancheepuram, Vellore (2 seats), Vandavasi, Krishnagiri, Dharmapuri, Salem, Erode (2 seats), Tiruchengode, Tiruppur, Pollachi, Coimbatore, Pudukkottai, Perambalur, Tiruchirappalli, Thanjavur, Kumbakonam, Mayuram (2 seats), Cuddalore (2 seats), Tindivanam (2 seats), Tirunelveli, Srivaikuntam, Sankaranainarkoil, Aruppukottai, Ramanathapuram, Srivilliputhur, Madurai (2 seats), Periyakulam and Dindigul. Madras constituency had significant Telugu population.

Results by Telugu-majority constituencies
These were 23 constituencies with 28 seats, namely Pathapatnam, Srikakulam, Vizianagaram, Visakhapatnam (2 seats), Kakinada, Rajahmundry (2 seats), Eluru (2 seats), Masulipatnam, Gudivada, Vijayawada, Tenali, Guntur, Narasaraopet, Ongole (2 seats), Nellore, Nandyal, Kurnool, Anantapur, Cuddapah, Chittoor (2 seats) and Tirupati. 

Congress stalwarts such as N. G. Ranga, Durgabai Deshmukh, and Mosalikanti Thirumala Rao lost in that election. Reason for the poor performance of Congress in Telugu-speaking areas both in general then referred as Andhra was attributed to their delay in the formation of a separate state for Telugu people. It eventually led to the formation of the Andhra state in 1953 and later the linguistic reorganization of Indian States in 1956.

Results by Kannada-majority constituencies
These were 3 constituencies with 3 seats, namely Bellary, South Kanara (North) and South Kanara South. However, Bellary constituency had significant Telugu minority population.

Results by Malayalam-majority constituencies
These were 5 constituencies with 6 seats, namely Cannanore, Tellicherry, Kozhikode, Malappuram and Ponnani (2 seats).

List of Elected MPs 
Telugu speaking areas had 28 seats from 23 constituencies (constituency serial numbers 1 to 24 except 19), Tamil speaking areas had 38 seats from 31 constituencies (constituency serial numbers 25 to 55), Kannada speaking areas had 3 seats from 3 (constituency serial numbers 19, 56 and 57) and Malayalam speaking areas had 6 seats from 5 constituencies (constituency numbers 58 to 62). Kannada-majority Bellary and Tamil-majority Madras has significant Telugu populations.

See also 
Elections in Tamil Nadu

Bibliography 
Volume I, 1951 Indian general election, 1st Lok Sabha

External links
 Website of Election Commission of India
 CNN-IBN Lok Sabha Election History

Notes

1951 Indian general election
Indian general elections in Tamil Nadu